 

This list of most-disliked YouTube videos contains the top 50 videos with the most dislikes of all time, as derived from YouTube charts. The dislike count was taken directly from the page of the video itself. YouTube implemented a like and dislike button on video pages from 2010 as part of a major site redesign. The feature served as a replacement for the previous five-star rating system, which was found to be ineffective because of the rare selection of ratings from two to four stars. Of the 50 videos in this list, 6 also appear in the list of most-viewed YouTube videos and 4 appear in the list of most-liked YouTube videos. Note that the dislike count does not indicate the true unpopularity of a video, which is better represented by dislike percentage, also provided in the table. For instance "Despacito", "Baby Shark Dance", and "Gangnam Style" all appear on this list, but also appear in the list of most-liked YouTube videos. , Cocomelon – Nursery Rhymes has the most videos in the top 50 with thirteen, YouTube has two and Jingle Toons have two.

On December 13, 2018, YouTube Rewind 2018: Everyone Controls Rewind became the most disliked video on the video sharing platform with 15 million dislikes, rapidly surpassing the music video for Justin Bieber's song "Baby", which previously entered the Guinness World Records book as the most disliked video on YouTube and on the Internet. As of July 9, 2021, YouTube Rewind 2018 has over 7.1 million more dislikes than Justin Bieber's Baby.

In March 2011, "Baby", which then had 1.17 million dislikes, was surpassed by the video for Rebecca Black's "Friday", yielding more than 1.2 million dislikes. "Friday" amassed over three million dislikes before the video was taken down in June 2011. The video was reinstated three months later and has not been taken down since.

Measurement of dislikes on YouTube has been of academic and political interest. Following its immediate negative reception, Rick Perry's 2012 presidential campaign advertisement "Strong" garnered over 600,000 dislikes within five days. This phenomenon was seen by Mike Barthel of The Village Voice as a reason not to judge entertainment and politics by the same standard of online publicity; he opined that the only time people are going to care more about politics than entertainment is when there is a clear and immediate threat to their well-being. Recently, many videos from news channels and corporations have been dislike bombed when they talk about topics like the 2020 election or the COVID-19 pandemic.

Music videos, including children's music videos, made up a majority of the most disliked uploads to YouTube. "Baby Shark Dance" is the most disliked "made for kids" video, with over 13.3 million dislikes. 2016 showed the most disliked video game trailer, Call of Duty: Infinite Warfare, which stands at over three million dislikes. It became YouTube's second-most-disliked video within two weeks of being released. In 2016, PewDiePie achieved a video in the top 3 by explicitly asking his own viewers to dislike his video.

In August 2020, the Indian film Sadak 2s trailer became the most disliked movie trailer on YouTube. In the first two days after its release, the trailer received 5.3 million dislikes and currently has over 12 million dislikes. On August 18, at about 18:00 UTC, it surpassed Justin Bieber's "Baby" to become the second most-disliked video with 13.24 million dislikes. As of October 2021, more than half of the top 50 most-disliked videos are music videos for children, with 31 of these 50 videos (62%) being set as "made for kids" according to YouTube's changes in policy on January 6, 2020, to comply with COPPA.

On November 10, 2021, YouTube made dislike counts on videos private, purportedly to "reduce harassment associated with targeted dislike attacks." The announcement and update was widely criticized by members of the YouTube community, including from creators and YouTube co-founder Jawed Karim, due to visible dislikes allowing users to immediately spot videos that are fraudulent, unhelpful, dangerous, explicit, discriminatory or generally poor-quality. However, there are some browser extensions which enable the user to be able to view estimations of current dislikes on videos. 

In the summer of 2022, two YouTube Shorts videos quickly surpassed YouTube Rewind 2018 to become the two most-disliked videos. As of January 2023, three YouTube Shorts videos have surpassed YouTube Rewind 2018 in terms of dislikes.

Top videos 

The following table lists the top 50 most disliked videos on YouTube, with the estimated and final visible dislike counts being rounded to the nearest multiple of 10,000 and 1,000 dislikes, respectively, as well as the creator, dislike percentage and date of publication to YouTube. On December 13, 2021, YouTube removed public dislike counts on all videos. The amount of dislikes just before they were hidden is shown below, taken from the night of December 12, 2021.

Legend: 
*N/A represent videos that were either published after December 13, 2021, or had unknown dislike counts at the time of YouTube's dislike update.

Historical most-disliked videos
The following table lists the last 4 videos to become YouTube's most disliked video, from the implementation of the dislike button in March 2010 to December 2021.

{| class=wikitable
! Title
! Uploader
! Dislikes*
! Upload date
! Date achieved
! Days held
! Ref(s)
! Notes
|-
| "~YouTube Worst Video of All Time~ vote 1 star, leave comment"*
| donotasyoudo
| ~195,000
| 
| 
| style=text-align:center;" | ~143
| 
|
|-
| "Baby"*| Justin Bieber
| ~200,000
| 
| ~
| style="text-align:center;" | ~220
| 
|
|- bgcolor="#ffd9d9"
| "Friday"‡
| trizzy66
| 1,200,000
| 
| 
| style="text-align:center;" | 79
| 
| 
|-
| "Baby"⁂
| Justin Bieber
| 1,450,000
| 
| 
| style="text-align:center;" |2,737
| 
|
|-
| "YouTube Rewind 2018: Everyone Controls Rewind"
|YouTube
| 9,882,000
| 
| 
| style="text-align:center;" |1,352
| 
|
|-
| "Revenge 😂"
|Lucas and Marcus
| 20,170,000
| 
| 
| style="text-align:center;" |
| 
|
|-
! colspan="8" style="text-align:center; font-size:8pt;" | As of 
|}

*The approximate number of dislikes each video had when it became YouTube's most-disliked video.''

Timeline of Most Disliked Videos (March 2010 – December 2021)

See also

 List of most-liked YouTube videos
 List of most-viewed YouTube videos
 List of most-subscribed YouTube channels
 List of most-viewed online videos in the first 24 hours

Notes

References

YouTube Most Disliked
Most Disliked
Criticism
YouTube controversies